Triplogyniidae is a family of mites in the order Mesostigmata.

Species
Triplogyniidae contains two genera, with ten recognized species:

 Genus Funkotriplogynium A. Kumar-Datta, 1985
 Funkotriplogynium bengalensis (Pramanik & Raychaudhuri, 1979)
 Funkotriplogynium iagobadius Seeman & Walter, 1997
 Funkotriplogynium irapora (Flechtmann, 1983)
 Funkotriplogynium ovulum (Berlese, 1904)
 Funkotriplogynium sisiri A. Kumar-Datta, 1985
 Funkotriplogynium valei (Fox, 1959)
 Genus Triplogynium Funk, 1977
 Triplogynium hirtellus (Berlese, 1916)
 Triplogynium indicum Pramanik & Raychaudhuri, 1980
 Triplogynium krantzi Funk, 1977
 Triplogynium ligniphilum Wisniewski & Hirschmann, 1993

References

Mesostigmata
Acari families